Tokodi is a surname. Notable people with the surname include:

Kiyika Tokodi, Congolese footballer
Pascal Tokodi (born 1993), Kenyan musician, actor, comedian, and songwriter

Surnames of African origin